Percy John Heawood (8 September 1861 – 24 January 1955) was a British mathematician, who concentrated on graph colouring.

Life
He was the son of the Rev. John Richard Heawood of Newport, Shropshire, and his wife Emily Heath, daughter of the Rev. Joseph Heath of Wigmore, Herefordshire; and a first cousin of Oliver Lodge, whose mother Grace was also a daughter of Joseph Heath. He was educated at Queen Elizabeth's School, Ipswich, and matriculated at Exeter College, Oxford in 1880, graduating B.A. in 1883 and M.A. in 1887.

Heawood spent his academic career at Durham University, where he was appointed Lecturer in 1885. He was, successively, Censor of St Cuthbert's Society between 1897 and 1901 succeeding Frank Byron Jevons in the role, Senior Proctor of the university from 1901, Professor in 1910 and Vice-Chancellor between 1926 and 1928.  He was awarded an OBE, as Honorary Secretary of the Preservation Fund, for his part in raising £120,000 to prevent Durham Castle from collapsing into the River Wear.

Heawood was fond of country pursuits, and one of his interests was Hebrew. His nickname was "Pussy".

Durham University awards an annual Heawood Prize to a student graduating in Mathematics whose performance is outstanding in the final year.

Works
Heawood devoted himself to the four colour theorem and related questions. In 1890 he exposed a flaw in Alfred Kempe's proof, that had been considered as valid for 11 years. The four colour theorem being an open question again, he established the weaker five colour theorem. The four colour theorem itself was finally established by a computer-based proof in 1976.

Heawood also studied colouring of maps on higher surfaces and established the upper bound on the chromatic number of such a graph in terms of the connectivity (genus, or number of handles) of the surface.  This upper bound was proved only in 1968 to be the actual maximum.

Writing in the Journal of the London Mathematical Society, G. A. Dirac wrote:

Family
Heawood married in 1890 Christiana Tristram, daughter of Henry Baker Tristram; they had a son and a daughter.

See also
Heawood conjecture
Heawood number
Heawood graph
Four color theorem
Five color theorem

References

External links
MacTutor biography

1861 births
1955 deaths
Newport, Shropshire
19th-century British mathematicians
20th-century British mathematicians
People from Newport, Shropshire
Combinatorialists
Academics of Durham University
Vice-Chancellors and Wardens of Durham University
Officers of the Order of the British Empire
Place of birth missing